Valea Mare is a commune in Dâmbovița County, Muntenia, Romania with a population of 2,512 people. It is composed of seven villages: Fețeni, Gârleni, Livezile, Saru, Stratonești, Valea Caselor and Valea Mare.

References

Communes in Dâmbovița County
Localities in Muntenia